Hold On to Your Heart is the fourth studio album by alternative rock band The Xcerts, released on 19 January 2018 through Raygun Music. The first single, "Feels Like Falling in Love", was released on 3 July 2018, and the second single, "Daydream", was released on 15 September. The album was announced on 21 September, and the third single, "Hold On to Your Heart", was released on 17 November. The fourth and final single, "Drive Me Wild", was released on 12 January 2018, and features Will Gardner of Brighton-based progressive rock band Black Peaks on saxophone. Gardner also played saxophone on the album's closing track, "Cry". The album was the band's first to reach the top 40 of the UK Albums Chart, spending one week at number 40.

Reception

The album received praise from Jake Haseldine of the When the Horn Blows saying that "[Despite some odd tracks, it is] one of the strongest albums the XCERTS have released so far and being the shortest of all four, it definitely packs a punch."

Chris Hilson of the Punktastic compared the new album to the style of Jimmy Eat World.

Kerrang! Magazine ranked "Hold On To Your Heart" at number 12 on their top 50 best albums of 2018. Rock Sound Magazine ranked it as the 24th best album of the year.

Accolades

Track listing

Personnel
Murray Macleod – guitar, vocals
Jordan Smith – bass guitar, vocals, piano
Tom Heron – drums, percussion, vocals
Will Gardner – saxophone (tracks 7 and 10)
Ryan Burnett – guitar (Late One Night EP)
Dave Eringa – producer
Gary Clark – producer
Mike Lord – producer (tracks 7 and 10), producer, mixing (Late One Night EP)
Chris Sheldon – mixing
John Davis – mastering
Ed Woods – mastering (Late One Night EP)

Charts

References

2018 albums
The Xcerts albums
Albums produced by Dave Eringa